Euthymius II, (? – 29 March 1416) was patriarch of Constantinople in 1410–16.

He became a monk at a young age and was soon after ordained a priest. He distinguished himself for his theological and rhetorical abilities, which he employed in defence of Palamism and against the Union of the Eastern Orthodox Church with the Roman Catholic Church, for which he was accorded the honorific appellation "Doctor of the Church". Despite being a fervent anti-unionist, he was sent by the Byzantine emperor Manuel II Palaiologos (reigned 1391–1425) to participate in the discussions for a prospective union with Pope Urban VI (1378–89). The mission achieved some success, but with no firm commitments on either side, and on his return to Constantinople he was promoted to archimandrite and became abbot of the prestigious Stoudios Monastery.

Eventually, Euthymius advanced to the post of protosynkellos, after which he became patriarch of Constantinople. During his tenure, he endeavoured to remove the Church from imperial control and act autonomously. Of his writings, only a philosophical treatise "On being and not being" and two letters survive. Euthymius II died on 29 March 1416.

References 

1340s births
1416 deaths
14th-century Byzantine monks
15th-century patriarchs of Constantinople
15th-century Byzantine writers
Byzantine theologians
Archimandrites
Abbots of the Stoudios Monastery
14th-century Eastern Orthodox theologians